Van–Cove High School was a comprehensive public high school located in Cove, Arkansas, United States. The school provided secondary education in grades 7 through 12 serving rural, distant communities of Polk County, Arkansas, primarily Vandervoort and Cove, hence Van–Cove. At the time of closure it was a part of the Cossatot River School District.

Prior to July 1, 2010, Van–Cove High School was part of the former Van–Cove School District; on that day the Van-Cove district merged into the Cossatot River district. The Cossatot River School District merged Van–Cove High School with Wickes High School into the Cossatot River High School, which opened in 2013.

Academics 
The assumed course of study followed the Smart Core curriculum developed by the Arkansas Department of Education (ADE), which requires students complete at least 22 units prior to graduation. Students complete regular coursework and exams and may take Advanced Placement (AP) courses and exam with the opportunity to receive college credit. Van–Cove High School is accredited by the ADE.

Extracurricular activities 
The Van–Cove High School mascot and athletic emblem was the Hornet with red and white serving as the school colors.

Athletics 
The Van–Cove Hornets competed in interscholastic activities within the 1A Classification, the state's smallest classification administered by the Arkansas Activities Association. The Hornets played within the 1A Region 7 West Conference. The Hornets participated in golf (boys/girls), bowling (boys/girls), basketball (boys/girls), cheer, and track (boys/girls).
 Basketball: The girls basketball teams won consecutive basketball state championships in 1996 and 1997.

References 

Public high schools in Arkansas
Public middle schools in Arkansas
Schools in Polk County, Arkansas
Defunct schools in Arkansas
2013 disestablishments in Arkansas
Educational institutions disestablished in 2013